Landgravine Elisabeth Henriëtte von Hessen-Kassel (18 November 1661 – 7 July 1683) was the daughter of William VI, Landgrave of Hesse-Kassel and Hedwig Sophia of Brandenburg (1623–1683) and electoral princess of Brandenburg through her marriage to Frederick I of Prussia.

Biography 
Elisabeth Henriëtte was born in Kassel, Germany on 18 November 1661 to William VI, Landgrave of Hesse-Kassel. She was the youngest of seven; siblings included Queen Charlotte Amalie, William VII, Luise, Charles I, Philip, and George. She suffered from an unknown illness in 1677 that her mother treated with the milk cure, wherein a teenage Elisabeth suckled from a wet nurse for three weeks and eventually recovered. Years later, on 13 August 1679, she married her cousin, Frederick, Prince Elector of Brandenburg, in Potsdam after his plan to marry a sister of Holy Roman Emperor Leopold I fell through. They held court in Köpenick Palace in a district of Berlin. On 29 September 1680, Luise Dorothea Sophie, the couple's only child, was born. Luise Dorothea later married Frederick I of Sweden, her first cousin, and became the electoral princess of Hesse-Kassel before dying in childbirth in 1705 at age 25.

Elisabeth Henriëtte died on 7 July 1683 at age 21 from smallpox. Frederick accused his stepmother Dorothea of poisoning her but this was found to be untrue via investigation. She is buried at Berlin Cathedral with Frederick and his second wife Sophia Charlotte.

Ancestry

References

1661 births
1683 deaths
Elisabeth Henriette
Elisabeth Henriette
Burials at Berlin Cathedral
Elisabeth Henriette
Elisabeth Henriette
Deaths from smallpox
People from the Landgraviate of Hesse-Kassel
Daughters of monarchs